The New Farmers of America (NFA) was organized in Tuskegee Alabama and became a national organization for African-American young men in 1935. The organization was formed to serve agriculture students in southern states where schools were segregated by law. Much like the National FFA Organization (FFA), NFA sought to provide young men with vocational, social and recreational activities in order to develop their skills in public speaking, leadership and agricultural trades.  The two organizations merged in 1965.

About the NFA 
NFA stands for New Farmers of America. The NFA was an organization designed to develop the qualities of leadership and citizenship of its members by allowing them to participate in conducting meetings, sharing in carrying out the program of activities of the chapter, and serving on committees. The organization afforded its members leadership opportunities  essential for their success as  modern farmers. These leadership abilities were developed through public speaking, judging, chapter contests, and from training received through the work of the chapter committees under the supervision of the local adviser.

Beginnings 
The NFA started as a vision of three men: Dr. H. O. Sargent, Federal Agent for Agricultural Education, U.S. Office of Education, George Washington Owens, Teacher Trainer, Virginia State College, and the “Father of NFA”,J.R. Thomas, Teacher Trainer, Virginia State College. NFA was a localized movement in Virginia around 1927.  H.O. Sargent, Federal Agent for Agricultural Education, and G.W. Owens, Teacher-Trainer at Virginia State College, were two of the earliest proponents of an organization for African-American farm youth.  While Owens wrote the constitution for the New Farmers of Virginia and helped lay the foundation for what would become a national organization, Sargent lobbied within the Department of Education to officially create an organization in segregated schools. As the idea grew in popularity, chapters formed sporadically throughout the southern states and region. State associations emerged next  and then sectional associations based on proximity: Washington, Gulf (later called Sargent), and A-L-Tex-O (later called Almmot).  These sections held conferences and contests unifying the state associations until a national organization was officially created on August 4, 1935.

Aim and Purpose 

The specific purposes were as follows:

 To develop competent, aggressive, agricultural and rural leadership.
 To encourage intelligent choice of farming occupations.
 To encourage members in the development of individual farming programs.
 To encourage members to improve the home, the farm and surroundings.
 To participate in worthy undertakings for the improvement of agriculture.
 To practice and encourage thrift.
 To develop character, train for useful citizenship, and foster patriotism.
 To participate in a cooperative effort.
 To provide and encourage the development of organized rural recreational activities.
 To strengthen confidence of farm boys and young men in themselves and their work.
 To encourage improvement in scholarship
 To create and nurture a love of country life.

Creed 
I believe in the dignity of farm work and that I shall prosper in proportion as I learn to put knowledge and skill into the occupations of farming.

I believe that the farm boy who learns to produce better crops and better livestock; who learns to improve and beautify his home surroundings will find joy and success in meeting the challenging situations as they arise in his daily living.

I believe that rural organizations should develop their leaders from within; that the boys in the rural communities should look forward to positions of leadership in the civic, social and public life surrounding them.

I believe that the life of service is the life that counts; that happiness endures to mankind when it comes from having helped lift the burdens of others.

I believe in the practice of cooperation in agriculture; that it will aid in bringing to the man lowest down a wealth of giving as well as receiving.

I believe that each farm boy bears the responsibility for finding and developing his talents to the end that the life of his people may thereby be enriched so that happiness and contentment will come to all.

Emblem 
The NFA emblem was made up of five symbols:
 plow representing tillage of the soil
 owl representing wisdom
 rising sun representing progress
 open boll of cotton with two leaves attached to its base representing the important economic agricultural interest of many members
 American eagle with shield, arrows, and an olive branch representing the wide scope of the organization.

References

External links
New Farmers of America Records, 1929-1965
 Impact of the New Farmers of America (Dissertation)

Youth organizations based in the United States
Agricultural organizations based in the United States
Career and technical student organizations